Khim Iglupas (born August 23, 1998 in Manila) is a Filipino juniors tennis player.

First year Playing for Philippines at the 2016 Fed Cup, Iglupas has a win–loss record of 6–1.

Fed Cup participation

Singles

Doubles

References

External links 
 
 
 Khim Iglupas - Philippines Women Athlete

1998 births
Living people
Sportspeople from Manila
Filipino female tennis players
Southeast Asian Games silver medalists for the Philippines
Southeast Asian Games medalists in tennis
Competitors at the 2017 Southeast Asian Games